Lebedino is a rural locality (a selo) and the administrative center of Lebedinsky Selsoviet, Tabunsky District, Altai Krai, Russia. The population was 474 as of 2013. There are 6 streets.

Geography 
Lebedino is located 45 km east of Tabuny (the district's administrative centre) by road. Yelizavetgrad is the nearest rural locality.

References 

Rural localities in Tabunsky District